Swampy Creek Falls is a scenic, two-tiered horsetail waterfall along an unnamed tributary of the White Salmon River, originating from Swampy Meadows, on Mount Adams west slope, with a total height of . Its main drop is about  feet. It cascades down over an exposure of andesite, then veiling out over sloped ledges below, among a secluded forest. The falls are located not more than 800 feet from Forest Route 23, and is noted for having a secluded nature, seeming as if nothing is around for miles.  It can be accessed while heading to the Midway High Lakes Area and Takhlakh Lake from Trout Lake or the Lewis River. From the road, viewers have to follow the Pacific Crest Trail for a few hundred feet, then crossing an unnamed stream on a footbridge. From here, hikers must follow the creek downstream to the top of the falls, then descending down to its base. The falls is managed by the Gifford Pinchot National Forest, of Washington state.

See also 
Waterfalls

References

External links 
Northwest Waterfall Survey: Swampy Creek Falls, Skamania County, Washington
World Waterfall Database: Swampy Meadows Falls, Skamania County, Washington, United States
Northwest Waterfall Survey: Images for Swampy Meadows Falls

Landforms of Skamania County, Washington
Waterfalls of Washington (state)
Gifford Pinchot National Forest
Mount Adams (Washington)
Waterfalls of Skamania County, Washington